The Passa Una River is a river of Paraná state in southern Brazil. Arising in the state capital Curitiba, it flows along the border with Campo Largo and flows into the Iguazu River in the municipality of Araucária.

See also
List of rivers of Paraná

References

Rivers of Paraná (state)
Araucária (Paraná)